Dehiovita Divisional Secretariat is a  Divisional Secretariat  of Kegalle District, of Sabaragamuwa Province, Sri Lanka.

References
 Divisional Secretariats Portal

Divisional Secretariats of Kegalle District

http://www.statistics.gov.lk/PopHouSat/CPH2011/Pages/Activities/Reports/District/Kegalle/A4.pdf